A list of films produced in Argentina in 1961:

External links and references
 Argentine films of 1961 at the Internet Movie Database

1961
Films
Argentine